Agninakshathram is a 2004 Indian Malayalam-language fantasy film  directed by Karim and produced by Shantha V. Nathan. The film stars Suresh Gopi, Biju Menon, Siddique And Jagathy Sreekumar in lead roles. The film had background score by S. P. Venkatesh and songs by Raveendran.

Plot
The story revolves around a Brahmin mansion, Thirumangalam Kovilakam, in which its members are tortured over decades by black magicians for acquiring a sacred idol to gain supernatural powers.

The elder one, Valyachan (Madampu Kunjukuttan) saves the family with his prayers and prudence every time. Following the marriage of an atheist member, Aniyan Thampuran (Biju Menon), a girl was born to him who has supernatural abilities. Believed to be an incarnation of Goddess, people from far abroad started visiting the girl for help. Chudala (Siddique (actor)) the disciple of black magicians, decides to enter the mansion in disguise to understand the girl's abilities and bring the mansion to ground. His plans are foiled by the elder one. As an answer to his prayers, a saviour reaches the mansion as Thalakkulathoor Nambi (Suresh Gopi) an incarnation of Lord Aditya (the sun God), in disguise as a Kalari master. The crux of story involves the fight between good and evil.

Cast
Suresh Gopi as Thalakkulathu Thambi
Biju Menon as Aniyan Thampuran
Sidduique as Chudalan /Maanaappan
Indraja as Ammu
Jagathy Sreekumar as Jayanthan
Sai Kumar as  Swami
Bindu Panicker as Sathi
Aishwarya as Aswathi Warrier
Baby Sanika as Rudra
Nassar as Muslim Saint
Kalabhavan Santhosh as Kutty Narayanan 
Ravi Menon as Doctor
Kannur Sreelatha as Villager
Madambu Kunjukuttan as Valyachan

Release
The film had a delayed release along with Thekkekkara Superfast on Vishu.

References

External links
 
 

2004 films
2000s Malayalam-language films
Films set in country houses